The Company of the Moluccas was a French trading company which was established in 1615 for trade in the East Indies. The company received trading privileges for the Far East for a period of 18 years.

On 1 June 1604, the French king Henry IV issued letter patents to Dieppe merchants to form the Dieppe Company, giving them exclusive rights to Asian trade for 15 years, but no ships were finally sent. Other cities such as Rouen maneuvered to obtain trading rights.

In 1615, the regent Marie de Médicis incorporated the merchants of Dieppe and other harbours to found the Company of the Moluccas. In 1616, two expeditions were sent to Asia from Honfleur in Normandy: three ships left for India, and two ships for Bantam. One ship returned from Bantam in 1617 with a small cargo, and letters from the Dutch expressing their hostility toward French ships in the East Indies. Also in 1616, two ships were sent from Saint-Malo to Java. One was captured by the Dutch, but the other obtained an agreement from the ruler of Pondicherry to build a fortress and a factory there, and returned with a rich cargo.

One of the main enterprises of the Company of the Moluccas was the expedition of Augustin de Beaulieu in 1619–1622.

The company was superseded with the creation of the Compagnie d'Orient in 1642, and the French East India Company in 1664.

See also

 France-Asia relations
 List of trading companies

Notes

Trading companies of France
1615 establishments in France